Plaza de la Ciudadanía (Citizenry Square) is a public square located in the southern façade of the Palacio de La Moneda (Chile's presidential palace) in Santiago. It used to be part of the grass garden and parking area of the Palace.

Construction began in November 2004, as part of the Bicentennial Projects (a series of public works initiated by the executive branch all over the country for the purpose of celebrating the nation's 200 years of independence). The first stage of the works, inaugurated in January 2006, featured as centerpiece the Centro Cultural Palacio de La Moneda ("La Moneda Palace Culture Centre"), a large underground cultural facility, as well as two water mirrors, two lines of fountains, a new underground parking area and the relocation of the statue of former-president Alessandri.

 

In the future, the nearby Alameda Avenue will go underground, allowing to connect the Plaza directly with the Paseo Bulnes (Bulnes Boulevard), respecting the original design of the Barrio Cívico de Santiago ("Civic Quarter"), with a grand perspective from the Palace and other government buildings down the Boulevard. This third phase of the project is still pending final approval.

Buildings and structures in Santiago
Squares in Chile
Tourist attractions in Santiago, Chile